Huamu Road is a station on Line 7 of the Shanghai Metro.

This station is the eastern terminus of Line 7, and entered operation on December 5, 2009. It is part of the first phase of Line 7. The station was originally named Fangdian Road.

The station is located in the Pudong New Area.

Gallery 

Railway stations in Shanghai
Line 7, Shanghai Metro
Railway stations in China opened in 2009
Shanghai Metro stations in Pudong